Zirjan (also Romanized as Zīrjān and Zīr Jān) is a village in Zibad Rural District, Kakhk District, Gonabad County, Razavi Khorasan Province, Iran. At the 2006 census, its population was 220, in 76 families.

References 

Populated places in Gonabad County